The Road to Glory is a 1926 American silent drama film directed by Howard Hawks and starring May McAvoy, Leslie Fenton, and Ford Sterling. This was Hawks' first film, based on a 35-page treatment that Hawks wrote. It is one of only two Hawks works that are lost films.

Plot
May McAvoy is a young woman, gradually going blind. She tries to spare her boyfriend Rockliffe Fellowes and her father Ford Sterling from the burden of her illness. She agrees to live with Leslie Fenton, a greedy rich man, in order to get away from her father and lover.

Cast

Production
Howard Hawks wrote the 35 page story from which the screenplay was based; this was one of few films on which he had extensive writing credits. Originally titled, The Chariot of the Gods, The Road to Glory was shot from December 1925 to January 1926 and premiered in April. The film contained religious iconography and messages that would never again be seen in a Hawks film.

Reception
It received good reviews from film critics. In later interviews, Hawks said, "It didn't have any fun in it. It was pretty bad. I don't think anybody enjoyed it except a few critics." Hawks was dissatisfied with the film after being certain that dramatic films would establish his reputation, but realized what he had done wrong when Sol Wurtzel told Hawks, "Look, you've shown you can make a picture, but for God's sake, go out and make entertainment."

See also
1937 Fox vault fire

Preservation status
With no prints of The Road to Glory located in any film archives, it is a lost film.

References

Bibliography
 Wes D. Gehring. Carole Lombard, the Hoosier Tornado. Indiana Historical Society Press, 2003.

External links

1926 films
Films directed by Howard Hawks
Lost American films
American silent feature films
Fox Film films
1920s English-language films
American black-and-white films
1926 drama films
1926 lost films
Lost drama films
1926 directorial debut films
1920s American films